The siege of Jerusalem (circa 589–587 BCE) was the final event of the Judahite revolts against Babylon, in which Nebuchadnezzar II, king of the Neo-Babylonian Empire, besieged Jerusalem, the capital city of the Kingdom of Judah. Jerusalem fell after a 30-month siege, following which the Babylonians systematically destroyed the city and the First Temple. The Kingdom of Judah was dissolved and many of its inhabitants were exiled to Babylon. 

During the late 7th century BCE, Judah became a vassal kingdom of Babylon. In 601 BCE, Jehoiakim, king of Judah, revolted against Babylonian rule despite the strong remonstrances of the prophet Jeremiah. Jehoiakim died for reasons unclear, and was succeeded by his son, Jeconiah. In 597 BCE, the Babylonians besieged Jerusalem, and the city surrendered. Nebuchadnezzar pillaged Jerusalem and deported Jeconiah and other prominent citizens to Babylon; Jeconiah's uncle, Zedekiah, was installed as king. Later, encouraged by the Egyptians, Zedekiah launched a second revolt, and a Babylonian army was sent to retake Jerusalem. 

On Tisha B'Av, 25 August 587 BCE or 18 July 586 BCE, the Babylonians took Jerusalem, destroyed the First Temple and burned down the city. The small settlements surrounding the city, and those close to the western border of the kingdom, were destroyed as well. According to the Bible, Zedekiah attempted to escape, but was captured near Jericho. He was forced to watch the execution of his sons in Riblah, and his eyes were then put out.

The destruction of Jerusalem and its temple led to a religious, spiritual and political crisis, which left its mark in prophetic literature and biblical tradition. The Kingdom of Judah was abolished and annexed as a Babylonian province with its center in Mizpah. The Judean elite, including the Davidic dynasty, were exiled to Babylon. After Babylon had fallen to Cyrus the Great, founder of the Persian Achaemenid Empire, in 539 BCE, he allowed the exiled Judeans to return to Zion and rebuild Jerusalem. The Second Temple was completed in 516 BCE.

Biblical narrative
Whereas the Nebuchadnezzar Chronicle provides information about the siege of Jerusalem in 597 BCE, the only known records of the siege that culminated in Jerusalem's destruction in 587 BCE are found in the Hebrew Bible.

Background
In 601 BCE, during the fourth year of his reign, Nebuchadnezzar unsuccessfully attempted to invade Egypt and was repulsed with heavy losses. The failure led to numerous rebellions among the Kingdoms of the Levant which owed allegiance to Babylon, including the Kingdom of Judah, where King Jehoiakim stopped paying tribute to Nebuchadnezzar and took a pro-Egyptian position.

In 597 BCE, Nebuchadnezzar laid siege to Jerusalem. Jehoiakim died during the siege and was succeeded by his son Jeconiah at an age of either eight or eighteen. The city fell about three months later, on 2 Adar (March 16) 597 BCE. Nebuchadnezzar pillaged both Jerusalem and the Temple and carted all of his spoils to Babylon. Jeconiah and his court and other prominent citizens and craftsmen, along with a sizable portion of the Jewish population of Judah; According to the Book of Kings, about 10,000 were deported from the land and dispersed throughout the Babylonian Empire.

Nebuchadnezzar installed Jeconiah's uncle, Zedekiah as vassal king of Judah, at the age of 21. However, despite the strong remonstrances of Jeremiah and others, Zedekiah revolted against Nebuchadnezzar by ceasing to pay tribute to him and entered an alliance with Pharaoh Hophra. Nebuchadnezzar II returned to Judah, aiming to capture Jerusalem.

Siege 
Nebuchadnezzar began a siege of Jerusalem in January 589 BCE. Many Jews fled to surrounding Moab, Ammon, Edom and other countries to seek refuge. The Bible describes the city as enduring horrible deprivation during the siege. The city fell after a siege, which lasted either eighteen or thirty months. In the eleventh year of Zedekiah's reign, Nebuchadnezzar broke through Jerusalem's walls, conquering the city. Zedekiah and his followers attempted to escape but were captured on the plains of Jericho and taken to Riblah. There, after seeing his sons killed, Zedekiah was blinded, bound, and taken captive to Babylon, where he remained a prisoner until his death.

Aftermath
According to the Bible, following the fall of Jerusalem, the Babylonian general Nebuzaradan was sent to complete its destruction. The city and Solomon's Temple were plundered and destroyed, and most of the Judeans were taken by Nebuzaradan into captivity in Babylon, with only a few people permitted to remain to tend to the land. Archaeological evidence confirms that the city was systematically destroyed by fire. Archeological evidence also indicates that towns close to the kingdom's western border and small villages in Jerusalem's near vicinity were destroyed.

Gedaliah, a Judean, was made governor of the remnant of Judah, the Yehud Province, with a Chaldean guard stationed at Mizpah. The Bible reports that, on hearing this news, Jews who had fled to Moab, Ammon, Edom, and in other countries returned to Judah. Gedaliah was assassinated by Ishmael son of Nethaniah two months later, and the population that had remained and those who had returned then fled to Egypt for safety. In Egypt, they settled in Migdol (it is uncertain where the Bible is referring to here, probably somewhere in the Nile Delta), Tahpanhes, Memphis (called Noph), and Pathros in the vicinity of Thebes.

Dating

There has been some debate as to when Nebuchadnezzar's second siege of Jerusalem took place. According to the Hebrew Bible, the city fell in the fourth month of Zedekiah's eleventh year. It is agreed that Jerusalem fell the second time in the summer month of Tammuz (as recorded in ). However, scholars disagree as to whether this dates to 586 BCE or 587 BCE. William F. Albright dated the end of Zedekiah's reign and the fall of Jerusalem to 587 BCE whereas Edwin R. Thiele offered 586 BCE. In 2004, Rodger Young published an analysis in which he identified 587 BCE for the end of the siege, based on details from the Bible and neo-Babylonian sources for related events. An independent study used 586 BCE for the destruction of Jerusalem as an anchor date for calibration of its archaeomagnetic dating method.

586 BCE 

Thiele's reckoning is based on the presentation of Zedekiah's reign on an accession basis, which he asserts was occasionally used for the kings of Judah. In that case, the year that Zedekiah came to the throne would be his zeroth year; his first full year would be 597/596 BCE, and his eleventh year, the year that Jerusalem fell, would be 587/586 BCE. Since Judah's regnal years were counted from Tishri in autumn, that would place the end of his reign and the capture of Jerusalem in the summer of 586 BCE.

587 BCE 
The Nebuchadnezzar Chronicle (BM 21946), published in 1956, indicates that Nebuchadnezzar captured Jerusalem the first time putting an end to the reign of Jehoaichin, on 2 Adar (16 March) 597 BCE, in Nebuchadnezzar's seventh year.  gives the relative periods for the end of the two sieges as Nebuchadnezzar's seventh and eighteenth years, respectively. Identification of Nebuchadnezzar's eighteenth year for the end of the siege places the event in the summer of 587 BCE, which is consistent with all three relevant biblical sources—Jeremiah, Ezekiel, and 2 Kings.

Archeological evidence
Archaeological evidence supports the biblical account that Jerusalem was destroyed in 587 or 586 BCE. Archaeological research has shown that the Babylonians systematically destroyed the city with fire and that the city wall was pulled down.

The remains of three residential structures excavated in the City of David (the Burnt Room, House of Ahiel, and House of Bullae) contain burned wooden beams from a fire started by the Babylonians in 586 BCE. Ash and burnt wood beams were also discovered at several structures in the Givati Parking Lot, which were attributed by the archeologists to the destruction of the city in 586 BCE. Arrowheads of the socketed bronze trilobate type, associated with the destruction of cities in the Assyrian heartland by the Babylonians and the Medes, likewise first appear in the Southern Levant in the burnt layers associated with Nebuchadnezzar II's destruction of the city. Samples of soil and fragments of a plaster floor recovered from one of the structures indicate that it was exposed to a temperature of at least 600° C.  A number of wine jars were found to contain remains of vanilla, indicating that the spice was used by the Jerusalemite elite before destruction of the city.

Archaeological investigations and surveys have also revealed that, about the time the Babylonians came to besiege Jerusalem, the majority of towns surrounding Jerusalem and along the kingdom's western frontier were also completely destroyed. However, it is unclear if the array of outlying communities to the east and south of the kingdom were destroyed at that time or if it was a continuous process that occurred after the collapse of the administrative structure of the kingdom and the loss of its military force. The region of Benjamin, located in the northern Judean hill country was mostly unaffected by the invasion and became the center of the Babylonian province of Yehud, with Mizpah as its administrative center.

References 

587
587 BC
6th century BC in the Kingdom of Judah
Jerusalem
Jerusalem
Jerusalem
Nebuchadnezzar II
Solomon's Temple